Camano was a steamboat built in 1906 at Coupeville, Washington which operated on Puget Sound from 1906 to 1917.  Camano was later known as Tolo.  As Tolo the vessel was sunk in 1917 as a result of a collision at sea.  Four people died as a result.

Design and construction
Camano was built by Capt. H.B. Lovejoy, doing business as the Island Transportation Company to run on the Everett – Coupeville, Washington shipping route as a replacement for the sternwheeler Fairhaven.

In 1910, Camano was rebuilt, after which the vessel had the following dimensions: ,  beam, and  depth of hold.  The vessel was kept on the Everett-Coupeville route however.  In 1911, when the steamer Calista was built for Island Transportation Co., at Dockton, Washington, Camano towed the new steamer to Seattle for completion.

Operations
From 1906 to 1912 Camano ran on a route from Coupeville to Everett.  H.B. Lovejoy's son, F.E. Lovejoy (1889–1940) served on board as a deckhand.  He had also carved the nameboard for the ship.

Camano burned oil a fuel which was just coming into use among the Puget Sound steamboats when Camano was built. Originally the oil fuel for Camano was supplied on barrels brought to Coupeville by Fairhaven, a woodburner like most of the older vessels. Refueling was later done at Clinton and Edmonds, Washington.

Every day except Sundays, Camano would depart Coupeville at 7:00 am southbound, stopping at Oak Harbor at 7:30 am, Camano Island at 8:15 am, Langley at 9:15 am, Clinton, Washington at 9:45 am,  arriving in Everett at 10:15 am.  Camano would depart Everett headed northbound at 3:00 pm.  Stops were made depending on call at Brown's Point. San de Fuca, and Saratoga.

Camano was too small to have sleeping quarters or a galley.  The crew's work day began 6:00 am, and they ate breakfast in the morning before work.  The crew didn't eat dinner until after the work day was complete, which was at 11:30 pm.  Lunch was a cold meal, with coffee heated up on the head of the high-pressure steam cylinder.

In March 1907, Camano towed the sternwheeler Fairhaven off the beach.  Fairhaven had been blown onto the dock at Coupeville during a gale, and then on to the shore, suffering substantial damage.

Camano was also placed on a route running from downtown Seattle to Alki Point.  It cost 10 cents to ride the boat on this run.

Sale to KCTC
Camano was sold to the Kitsap County Transportation Company and renamed Tolo.  In November, 1915, Kitsap County Transportation Company purchased Camano for $15,000.

Accidents
Camano was involved in several accidents.  In one instance, on August 16, 1912,  the much larger  steel-hulled steamship Sioux, coming in from Seattle, was approaching the Everett dock.  From the bridge, Capt. William Thorton of Sioux signaled the engine room for "half astern" to slow the vessel down.  Instead the engine room gave him "half ahead" which caused the steamer to ram into the dock.  Captain Thorton then signaled for "full astern".

Another mistake was made and the Sioux went full ahead, smashing into Camano'''s stern, driving Camano forward into the  gasoline launch  Island Flyer which in turn struck the newly built motor launch Alverene.   Island Flyer  was sunk as a result and Alverene was seriously damaged.  Camano then sank at the dock.  The small launch Arrow was demolished and the steam launches Ranger and Daphne suffered lesser damage.  The total damage was valued at $30,000.  It turned out that an engine room assistant, known as an oiler had been left in charge of the telegraph.  No one was killed although there was at least one close call.

On March 1, 1914, in Elliott Bay, Camano collided with Modoc not far from the piers of the central Seattle waterfront.  The collision was ruled to have been Modoc′s fault.

Sinking
In November, 1917, under the command of Capt. George Benson, Tolo was en route from Seattle to Bainbridge Island in a heavy fog with eight crew and 53 passengers on board.  The tug Magic (67 gross tons) collided with Camano, and Camano sank in less than eight minutes.  Magic sent off distress signals.  H.B. Kennedy responded.  The skillful crew of the Kennedy, with the aid of Magic, was able to rescue most of the people from Camano.  Four people died however, two women and one man from the passengers, and from the crew, the Chinese cook.

Notes

 References 
 Faber, Jim, Steamer's Wake—Voyaging down the old marine highways of Puget Sound, British Columbia, and the Columbia River, Enetai Press, Seattle, WA 1985 
 Kline, Mary S., and Bayless, G.A., Ferryboats—A Legend on Puget Sound, Bayless Books, Seattle, WA 1983 
 Newell, Gordon R., ed., H.W. McCurdy Marine History of the Pacific Northwest,  Superior Publishing Co., Seattle, WA (1966)
 Newell, Gordon R., Ships of the Inland Sea, Superior Publishing Co., Seattle, WA (2nd Ed. 1960)
 Newell, Gordon R. and Williamson, Joe, Pacific Steamboats, Superior Publishing, Seattle WA (1958).
  Annual list of merchant vessels of the United States By United States. Dept. of the Treasury. Bureau of Statistics, United States. Dept. of the Treasury. Bureau of Navigation (1913)
 Prasse, Karen and Stanwood Area Historical Society, Camano Island'', Arcadia Publishing,  (2006)
 State of Washington, Public Service Commission, Annual Report (1916) (accessed 06-04-11)
 Sherman, Roger, "Coupeville Wharf History" (April 2009) (accessed 06-04-11)

1906 ships
Steamboats of Washington (state)
Propeller-driven steamboats of Washington (state)
Maritime incidents in 1912
Maritime incidents in March 1914
Maritime incidents in 1917
History of Island County, Washington
History of Snohomish County, Washington
Everett, Washington
Kitsap County Transportation Company
Ships sunk in collisions
Shipwrecks of the Washington coast